The Beinan River is a river in Taiwan. It flows through Taitung County for 84 kilometers.

See also
List of rivers in Taiwan

References

Landforms of Taitung County
Rivers of Taiwan